is a Japanese naval officer who served as the Self Defense Fleet's Commander of the Japanese Maritime Self Defence Force (JMSDF) since 7 August 2020. He is the 51st Commander of the Self Defense Fleet, succeeding Hiroyuki Kasui.

Career
Born in Tokushima prefecture. In March 1986, he graduated from the 30th term of the National Defense Academy (electrical engineering), joined the Maritime Self-Defense Force.

In July 2000, he was promoted to 2nd class Kaisa.

In March 2001, he worked at the Equipment System Division of the Maritime Staff Office.

In August 2002, he was assigned to the role of Captain aboard destroyer Mineyuki.

In August 2003, he joined the National Institute for Defense Studies staff.

In July 2004, he worked in the Assistant Division of the Maritime Staff Office.

In January 2005, he was promoted to 1st class Kaisa.

In August 2007, he worked at the Equipment System Division, Maritime Staff Office. In December of the same year, he was assigned to the Maritime Staff Office Equipment System Division Ship System Group Leader.

in March 2008, he was assigned to the role of Commander of the 14th Escort Corps.

In March 2010, General Manager, Deputy Division, Personnel Education Department, Maritime Staff Office. In August of the same year, Assistant Manager, Personnel Education Department, Maritime Staff Office.

In December 2011, he was promoted to Rear Admiral, Commander of the 2nd Escort Group.

In December 2013, he was the Training Squadron Commander.

In December 2014, Director of Training Department, National Defense Academy.

In March 2016, Mine Warfare Force Commander.

In December 2017, he was promoted to Maritime General, Chief of Maritime Self-Defense Force Executive School,

In April 2019, he was the Commander of the 39th Escort Fleet.

On 7 August August 2020, he was assigned as the Commander of the 51st Self-Defense Fleet

Awards
 
 3rd Defensive Memorial Cordon

 7th Defensive Memorial Cordon

 10th Defensive Memorial Cordon

 11th Defensive Memorial Cordon

 18th Defensive Memorial Cordon

 19th Defensive Memorial Cordon

 22nd Defensive Memorial Cordon

 21st Defensive Memorial Cordon

 26th Defensive Memorial Cordon

 32nd Defensive Memorial Cordon

 33rd Defensive Memorial Cordon

 37th Defensive Memorial Cordon

 41st Defensive Memorial Cordon

See also
Japanese military ranks

References

1964 births
People from Tokushima Prefecture
Military personnel from Tokushima Prefecture
Living people